

Szczecinek County is a unit of territorial administration and local government (powiat) in West Pomeranian Voivodeship, north-western Poland. It came into being on January 1, 1999, as a result of the Polish local government reforms passed in 1998.

As of 2006 its total population is 77,232, out of which the population of Szczecinek is 38,756, that of Borne Sulinowo is 4,224, that of Barwice is 3,838, that of Biały Bór is 2,127, and the rural population is 28,287.

Neighbouring counties
Szczecinek County is bordered by Koszalin County to the north, Bytów County to the north-east, Człuchów County to the east, Złotów County to the south, Drawsko County and Świdwin County to the west, and Białogard County to the north-west.

Administrative division
The county is subdivided into six gminas (one urban, three urban-rural and two rural). These are listed in the following table, in descending order of population.

References
Polish official population figures 2006

 
Szczecinek